is a Japanese anime television series animated by OLM, Inc. and directed by Naohito Takahashi. The series features character designs by Yuriko Chiba and music by Toshihiko Takamizawa (of the rock band The Alfee). The series has a monthly one hour time slot per episode (46 minutes of actual episode) rather than the standard weekly half hour time slot.

Each episode consists of about 35–40 minutes of the titular Tsubasa's and Hikaru's school lives, and is typically concluded by about 5–10 minutes of fighting alien monsters called Maguar. The main theme of this series revolves around Tsubasa growing up and learning how to cope with life events, such as the loss of her mother and her familiar environment, than the fighting present in each episode. The plot is driven by Tsubasa learning from Hikaru and her experiences with her new sister at school, as it is by the presence of the Maguar. There tends to be less cross-interference of mundane and fantastic life than is typical of magical girl anime.

Plot	

Tsubasa Shiina is a timid grade schooler who is forced to move to Hokkaidō from Tokyo with her father, as he pursues his dream of being a baker in the aftermath of her mother's death. At her new school, she is so shy and unsociable that her classmates ignore her at best, and abuse her inability to defend herself at worst.

Shortly after the two begin to settle in, an alien spaceship comes crashing down to earth one night in the forest behind her house. Stumbling across the ship with her dog, Tsubasa discovers the alien pilot, unconscious and wounded, and a monster trying to kill him. The alien wakes and tries to fight off the monster, while Tsubasa, in her fright, tries to hide from the monster inside of the ship. The monster quickly takes care of the alien, seemingly killing him and in the process releasing him from some sort of transformation, and then tries to reach into the ship to get at Tsubasa. In its effort to reach her, the monster accidentally cracks a mysterious container, causing its mostly-liquid contents to leak out onto the floor next to Tsubasa. Making contact with Tsubasa, it converges onto her as a strange substance that transforms her into what appears to be a female, teenage equivalent of the form the alien transformed into while fighting the monster. With the aid of this mysterious 'power-up', Tsubasa is able to defeat the monster, despite it being somewhat accidental on her part. 

When the battle is over, Tsubasa reverts back to her normal form, but the strange substance turns into an visually identical copy of herself upon separation. The alien awakens, and together, all three return to Tsubasa's house and stay the night in her room. The next day the alien introduces himself as D.D. and explains that he was transporting the seeds of a monster called a Maguar, when one of the seeds hatched and attacked him, forcing his ship to crash land on Earth. The copy of herself, who claims the name of Hikaru, is a type of combat suit called a Figure that for some reason has assumed its current form, and has all of Tsubasa's memories. The real problem is the Maguar Tsubasa had defeated was only one of the six Maguars D.D. was transporting; the others were now scattered somewhere throughout Hokkaidō. D.D. eventually realizes he will need the girls' help to destroy the remaining Maguar, as earth's atmosphere has enhanced both Hikaru and the Maguar in a similar way, while he waits for reinforcements.

To facilitate the problem of suddenly having a twin that no one knows about, D.D. decides to modify the memories of Tsubasa's father, making him believe he had twin daughters all along, and that Hikaru was simply living elsewhere with an aunt. Passing himself off as a visiting photographer friend, D.D. proceeds to monitor the Maguar from his ship, while Tsubasa and Hikaru live together at Tsubasa's house, go to school together at Tsubasa's school, fight together as Figure 17 against the Maguar, and essentially become siblings in a more emotional sense.

Characters

Main characters

A shy and timid 10-year-old girl originally from Tokyo. Her mother died during childbirth, leading Tsubasa to sometimes blame herself for her death. Her self-esteem slowly improves after coming into contact with the artificial being that names herself Hikaru.

When she first comes into contact with Tsubasa, they combine into Figure 17, whose abilities surpass those of other Figures. Instead of reverting into her dormant state, the Ribers becomes a clone of Tsubasa and calls herself Hikaru. In contrast to Tsubasa, Hikaru is more lively and outgoing.

A galactic police officer originally on his way to his home planet with six  eggs when one of them suddenly hatches during warp, forcing him to crash on Earth. He is given the name D.D. by Hikaru, as it is the closest way to pronounce his native name. While staying in Hokkaido, D.D. uses the pseudonym Daisuke Domoto and poses as a landscape photographer.

A galactic police officer sent to Earth in response to D.D.'s distress signal. Orudina is not happy that D.D. broke protocol by crashing on Earth and getting Tsubasa involved in the Maguar threat.

School children

A boy in Tsubasa and Hikaru's class. Sho is unable to participate in sports activities due to health reasons, but he is exceptionally talented in music and stage play writing.

An antisocial boy in Tsubasa and Hikaru's class. He is often confrontational and hesitates to take his responsibilities seriously.

The class representative and a close friend of Tsubasa and Hikaru.

A girl who is friends with Tsubasa, Hikaru, and Asuka.

A boy who hangs out with Kenta.

An arrogant girl who frequently looks down on Tsubasa.

A boy from the opposite class who often gets into fights with Kenta and has a crush on Hikaru.

Adults

Tsubasa's father. Originally from Tokyo, Hideo moves to Hokkaido with Tsubasa to pursue a career as a baker at the Ibaragi ranch.

The homeroom teacher of Tsubasa and Hikaru's class.

Owner of the Ibaragi bakery.

Shinichi's wife.

Shinichi and Kyoko's daughter. As a teenager, Sakura is rebellious towards her parents and has a heated argument with her mother over going to a concert in Sapporo.

Shinichi's father and the owner of the Ibaragi ranch, which produces milk and cheese for the bakery.

Rokuro's wife.

A cultural journalist who investigates the sudden deterioration of Hokkaido's forestry due to Maguar activity.

Episodes

Production notes
Figure 17 first aired on TV Tokyo's satellite anime channel AT-X on May 27, 2001. This anime is unusual in that the episodes are about twice as long as most standard TV anime broadcast episodes, at 46 minutes per episode. Furthermore, the series was broadcast on a monthly basis. TV Tokyo re-aired the series on a weekly basis from January 11 to June 26, 2002; episodes 1 and 13 aired in their entirety while episodes 2-12 were each split into two episodes, bringing the total episode count to 24.

In the United States, the series was broadcast on the ImaginAsian network in 2004. It was also streamed online through Tubi in 2017.

The music was composed by Toshihiko Takamizawa of the band The Alfee, which recorded the opening theme "Boy" and the ending theme "Fairy Dance" (both songs available on their 2001 album Glint Beat). In an interview, Takamizawa said that he was told that Figure 17 was a mix of John Carpenter's The Thing and the J-Drama series Kita no Kuni Kara (From a Northern Country).

Media

Anime
Bandai Visual distributed the series on VHS and DVD in Japan in single-episode volumes (totaling 13 volumes) under the Emotion label. It was compiled in a DVD box set on April 22, 2011. The series was licensed in North America by Media Blasters (under the AnimeWorks label) and released in six DVD volumes from 2003 to 2004, as well as a box set in 2005. This version was also licensed in Australia and New Zealand by Madman Entertainment.

Manga
A manga adaptation of the series was illustrated by Guy Nakahira and published in the magazine Dengeki Daioh. Spanning only two volumes, the adaptation is considerably shorter than the TV series, condensing most of the series' storyline, removing some of the supporting characters and shortening the fight scenes to only a few pages. The manga was licensed in North America and translated in English by ADV Manga.

Novel
A novelization of the series was penned by screenplay writer Shoji Yonemura with illustrations by character designer Yuriko Chiba and published by Dengeki Bunko.

Soundtrack
The series' soundtrack, released by Lantis, consists of the background music composed by Toshihiko Takamizawa. The opening and ending themes are not available on this disc. In addition, an image album was released, featuring songs performed by Akiko Yajima and Fumiko Orikasa.

References

External links
 
 
 

2001 anime television series debuts
2002 Japanese novels
Dengeki Bunko
Dengeki Daioh
Lantis (company)
Bandai Visual
Light novels
Shōnen manga
OLM, Inc.
Anime with original screenplays
Anime and manga set in Hokkaido